The 2019 European Open was a men's tennis tournament played on indoor hard courts. It was the fourth edition of the European Open and part of the ATP Tour 250 series of the 2019 ATP Tour. It took place at the Lotto Arena in Antwerp, Belgium, from October 14 to October 20.

Singles main-draw entrants

Seeds

1 Rankings are as of October 7, 2019

Other entrants
The following players received wildcards into the singles main draw: 
  Kimmer Coppejans
  Jannik Sinner
  Stan Wawrinka

The following players received entry using a protected ranking into the singles main draw:
  Steve Darcis
  Jozef Kovalík
  Andy Murray

The following players received entry from the qualifying draw:
  Grégoire Barrère 
  Marius Copil 
  Yannick Maden 
  Kamil Majchrzak

Withdrawals
Before the tournament
 Benoît Paire → replaced by  Hugo Dellien
 Albert Ramos Viñolas → replaced by  Kwon Soon-woo
 Milos Raonic → replaced by  Peter Gojowczyk

Doubles main-draw entrants

Seeds

1 Rankings are as of October 7, 2019

Other entrants
The following pairs received wildcards into the doubles main draw:
  Ruben Bemelmans /  Kimmer Coppejans
  Arnaud Bovy /  Steve Darcis

The following pair received entry as alternates:
  Paolo Lorenzi /  Jannik Sinner

Withdrawals
Before the tournament
  Feliciano López

During the tournament
  Diego Schwartzman

Finals

Singles 

  Andy Murray defeated  Stan Wawrinka, 3–6, 6–4, 6–4

Doubles 

  Kevin Krawietz /  Andreas Mies defeated  Rajeev Ram /  Joe Salisbury, 7–6(7–1), 6–3

References

External links 
 

2019
2019 ATP Tour
2019 in Belgian tennis
European Open